Blanche DuBois (married name Grey) is a fictional character in Tennessee Williams' 1947 Pulitzer Prize-winning play A Streetcar Named Desire. The character was written for Tallulah Bankhead and made popular to later audiences with Elia Kazan's 1951 film adaptation of Williams' play; A Streetcar Named Desire, starring Vivien Leigh and Marlon Brando.

Character overview
The recently penniless and homeless Blanche DuBois arrives in New Orleans--though with the attitude of a wealthy woman--to stay with her sister Stella and her brother-in-law Stanley Kowalski. A former schoolteacher from a wealthy family, she has been evicted from her family home, Belle Reve, after the deaths of several family members wiped out her and Stella's inheritance. It is also later revealed that, years earlier, her husband, Allan Grey, committed suicide after she caught him having sex with another man. She had a series of meaningless affairs to numb her grief, and was soon thrown out of her hometown of Laurel, Mississippi, as a "woman of loose morals" after sleeping with a 17-year-old boy.

Behind her veneer of social snobbery and sexual propriety, Blanche is deeply insecure, an aging Southern belle who lives in a state of perpetual panic about her fading beauty and concerns about how others perceive her looks. She is nervous, and constantly flutters and paces about. Her manner is dainty and frail, and she sports a wardrobe of showy but tattered evening clothes, as indicated in the stage directions for Scene 10: "She had decked herself out in a somewhat soiled and crumpled white satin evening gown and a pair of scuffed silver slippers with brilliants set in their heels."

She has an obsession with staying out of direct light, and even covers a light bulb with a paper lantern. She bathes several times a day and goes through many bottles of perfume during her stay with Stella.

Role in the play
From the start, Blanche is appalled by her sister's poor living quarters and the coarseness of her brother-in-law. Williams shows her physical appearance in stark contrast to Stella's humble quarters which foreshadows her inability to conform in a world dominated by patriarchal values that Stanley represents. She calls Stanley an ape, and shames Stella for marrying a man so violent and animalistic. Blanche is not shy about expressing her contempt for Stanley and the life he has given her sister, which makes him proud. For his part, Stanley resents Blanche's superior attitude, and is convinced that she has squandered Stella's portion of the money from the sisters' ancestral home. Blanche's character creates a sense of duality right from the start as she keeps looking for alcohol and her exaggerated airs of propriety create suspicion.

Blanche begins dating Stanley's friend Harold "Mitch" Mitchell, who is distinct from Stanley in his courtesy and propriety, and sees in him a chance for happiness. That hope is destroyed, however, when Stanley learns of Blanche's past from a traveling salesman who knew her, and reveals it to Mitch. Mitch learns that Blanche had been seen numerous times at a hotel with a specifically bad reputation. It is implied that she had been entertaining men in a way that she was not with Mitch, under the facade of being old-fashioned. He also learns that she did not willingly leave her job as a schoolteacher, but was actually let go due to inappropriate relations with an underage student. After this, Mitch ends the relationship. Blanche begins drinking heavily and escapes into a fantasy world, conjuring up the notion that an old flame, a millionaire named Shep Huntleigh, is imminently planning to take her away.

The night Stella goes into labor, Stanley and Blanche are left alone in the apartment, and Stanley, drunk and powerful, rapes her. This event, coupled with the fact that Stella does not believe her, sends Blanche over the edge into a nervous breakdown. In the final scene, Blanche is led off to a mental hospital by a matron and a kind-hearted doctor. After a brief struggle, Blanche smilingly acquiesces as she loses all contact with reality, addressing the doctor with the most famous line in the play: "Whoever you are...I have always depended on the kindness of strangers."

Portrayals

Blanche DuBois has been portrayed several times on stage and on screen.

Jessica Tandy received a Tony Award for her performance as Blanche in the original Broadway production. Uta Hagen took over the role of Blanche for the national tour, which was directed by Harold Clurman.

Blanche was also portrayed by Vivien Leigh in the London stage production, which was directed by her then-husband Laurence Olivier, She reprised the role in the 1951 film adaptation. The film was directed by Elia Kazan, and Leigh won her second Academy Award for this performance.

Tallulah Bankhead portrayed the role in 1956. Bankhead, a close friend of Williams, had been the inspiration for the role, and he wanted her to star in it. However, she was initially uninterested and the producer thought she would overpower the character's fragility. When she played the role in 1956, some critics agreed she was too strong in it, but Williams personally felt that she gave a "heroic" portrayal of the role.

Blanche has been portrayed onstage by Kim Stanley, Ann-Margret, Arletty, Blythe Danner, Cate Blanchett, Claire Bloom, Faye Dunaway, Lois Nettleton, Jessica Lange (who reprised the role in the 1995 television adaptation), Marin Mazzie, Natasha Richardson, Laila Robins, Rosemary Harris, Rachel Weisz, Amanda Drew, Nicole Ari Parker, Isabelle Huppert, Glenn Close, Gillian Anderson and Maxine Peake.

Etymology and inspiration
The character is reputedly named after theatre critic Blanche Marvin, a former actress and friend of Williams. Some critics believe that Blanche du Bois was inspired by Williams' mother. 

Blanche DuBois’ personality and character, along with that of Scarlett O'Hara (from Margaret Mitchell's 1936 novel Gone with the Wind), were combined to serve as the inspiration for the character of Blanche Devereaux from the sitcom Golden Girls, who was portrayed by Rue McClanahan throughout the series (1985-1992).

References

External links

Characters in plays
Drama film characters
Female characters in literature
Fictional characters from Mississippi
Literary characters introduced in 1947
Theatre characters introduced in 1947
Fictional characters with psychiatric disorders
Fictional schoolteachers
Fictional socialites
Female characters in theatre
Female characters in film
Fictional victims of sexual assault